GIS in environmental contamination is the use of GIS software in mapping out the contaminants in soil and water using the spatial interpolation tools from GIS.  Spatial interpolation allows for more efficient approach to remediation and monitoring of soil and water contaminants.  Soil and water contamination by metals and other contaminants have become a major environmental problem after the industrialization across many parts of the world.  As a result, environmental agencies are placed in charge in remediating, monitoring, and mitigating the soil contamination sites.  GIS is used to monitor the sites for metal contaminants in the soil, and based on the GIS analysis, highest risk sites are identified in which majority of the remediation and monitoring takes place.

GIS in soil contamination
Soil contamination from heavy elements can be found in the urban environments, which can be attributed to the transportation and industries along with the background levels (minerals-leaching heavy elements from weathering).  Also, some of the most soil contaminated areas are around the mines such as the ones in Slovenia, Bosnia and Herzegovina, and in United States (Sulphur Bank Superfund Site, in California).  In a study area, GIS is used for the analysis of spatial relationship of the contaminants within the soil.

Soil contamination in Slovenia
In Idrija, Slovenia, where the world’s second largest mercury (Hg) mine operated has a significant amount of Hg emissions into the atmosphere by a surface process of adsorption of Hg from and to soil particles surfaces, which results in a diffusion of Hg through the pores of soil.  To calculate the emission flux for Hg, a Hg emission model was developed:

lnFHg=Ea/(R*Ts )+n*ln[Hg]s+m+0.003*Rz	    Equation 1

in which the FHg is the flux of Hg emission, Ea is the activation energy, R is the gas constant, Ts is the soil temperature, n and m are constants, [Hg]s is the Hg concentration, and 0.003* Rz accounts for the solar radiation since the solar radiation has the effect on the temperature, hence the solar radiation has the effect on the emission flux of Hg.
Once the Hg concentration data was gathered, a schematic model has been prepared for GIS input, which consisted of a digital elevation model (DEM), a satellite land use map, and EARS data.  Using the inverse distance weighted (IDW) method from geostatistical tools in ArcGIS 9.3, a raster model of the Hg concentration has been produced for the Idrija area.

DRASTIC Summary Index Score modeled using GIS
Under certain hydrological parameters, some aquifers are more prone to contamination than other aquifers.  The parameters that are taken into consideration when calculating the vulnerability of aquifers to contamination are: depth to water (factor d), net recharge (factor r), aquifer media (factor a), soil media (factor s), topography (factor t), impact of the vadose zone (factor i), and the hydraulic conductivity (factor c), which together spell out DRASTIC. Furthermore, there is a weighting factor associated with each of the parameters that can range from one to five.  In addition, the lower the numbers for the DRASTIC index after the assessment of the aquifer, than the lower the risk of aquifer contamination in that area.  These seven parameters derive DRASTIC summary index score, which determines which are more prone to contamination than other.  The significance of the DRASTIC summary index score is that it shows areas that are more prone; as a result, the state or local authorities depending on the scale will place necessary measures in place that would prevent or mitigate contamination of the water supply.  
Using GIS, a map was developed for the seven counties (Hillsborough, Polk, Manatee, Hardee, Sarasota, DeSoto, and Charlotte) in Florida, which shows the DRASTIC summary index score for the Floridan Aquifer System, Surficial Aquifer System, and Other Rocks aquifer.  The developed map is a combination of multiple layers that are stacked on top of each other as shown in Figure 1.

References

External links 
 http://www.usgs.gov/
 http://www.fgdl.org/

Applications of geographic information systems
Soil contamination